United Democratic Republican Front was a political party in Nepal. The president of the Front was Ram Man Shrestha (former CPN(ML) Upper House Member).

On May 11, 2007, the Front merged into the Communist Party of Nepal (Maoist). At the time of the merger, the membership of the Front was estimated at around 400.

References

Political parties in Nepal
2017 disestablishments in Nepal